The TSV Schott Mainz is a German association football club from the town of Mainz, Rhineland-Palatinate. Apart from football the club also offers more than 30 other sports like ice hockey, field hockey and American football and has 4,000 members. It is financially supported by the Schott AG.

The club's greatest success has been to earn promotion to the tier four Regionalliga Südwest in 2017.

History
Formed in 1953 the club, then under the name of TuS Glaswerk Schott Mainz earned promotion to the tier-four 2. Amateurliga Rheinhessen in 1962. Its first season there was a success, coming third in the league but results declined from there on and, by 1969 the club was relegated again after coming last. In the next four decades the club played in local amateur football before returning to its former heights.

Mainz began its rise through the league system in 2008 when it won the local Kreisliga championship, the first of four consecutive championships and promotions. In 2009 the club won the Bezirksklasse, followed by the Bezirksliga in 2010 and the Landesliga in 2011. Playing in the Verbandsliga Südwest for the next three seasons from 2011 Mainz came seventh in its first season there, followed by a runners-up finish in 2013. A Verbandsliga title in 2014 meant the club was promoted to the Oberliga Rheinland-Pfalz/Saar for the first time.

Honours
The club's honours:
 Verbandsliga Südwest
 Champions: 2014
 Runners-up: 2013
 Landesliga Südwest-Ost
 Champions: 2011
 Bezirksliga Rheinhessen
 Champions: 2010
 Bezirksklasse Rheinhessen-Nord
 Champions: 2009
 Kreisliga Mainz-Bingen-West
 Champions: 2008
 Southwestern Cup
 Champions: 2022

Recent seasons
The recent season-by-season performance of the club:

With the introduction of the Regionalligas in 1994 and the 3. Liga in 2008 as the new third tier, below the 2. Bundesliga, all leagues below dropped one tier.

Key

References

External links
 Official team site  
 Das deutsche Fußball-Archiv  historical German domestic league tables

Football clubs in Germany
Football clubs in Rhineland-Palatinate
Association football clubs established in 1953
1953 establishments in West Germany
Tsv